Tatra is a Czech vehicle manufacturer from Kopřivnice. It is owned by the TATRA TRUCKS a.s. company, and it is the third oldest company in the world producing cars with an unbroken history. The company was founded in 1850 as Ignatz Schustala & Cie, in 1890 renamed in German Nesselsdorfer Wagenbau-Fabriksgesellschaft when it became a wagon and carriage manufacturer. In 1897, Tatra produced the first motor car in Central Europe, the Präsident automobile. In 1918, it changed its name to Kopřivnická vozovka a.s., and in 1919 it changed from the Nesselsdorfer marque to the Tatra badge, named after the nearby Tatra Mountains on the Czechoslovak-Polish border (now on the Polish-Slovak border).

In interwar period, Tatra came to international prominence with its line of affordable cars based on backbone tube chassis and air-cooled engines, starting with Tatra 11 (1923). The company also became the pioneer of automotive aerodynamics, starting with Tatra 77 (1934). Following the 1938 German-Czechoslovak war and Munich Agreement, town of Kopřivnice was occupied by Nazi Germany and Tatra's production was directed towards military production. Trucks like Tatra 111 (1942) became instrumental both for the German Nazi war effort as well as post-war reconstruction in Central Europe and Soviet Union.

Today, Tatra's production focuses on heavy off-road trucks based on its century long development of backbone chassis, swinging half-axles and air-cooled engines. Core of its production are Tatra 817 intended primarily for military operators and Tatra Phoenix (Tatra chassis with DAF cabin and Paccar water-cooled engine) aimed primarily for civilian market. In 2023, the company plans to produce over 2.000 trucks.

Early years

Ignaz Schustala (1822–1891), founder of the company "Ignatz Schustala & Comp" in Kopřivnice, started the production of horse-drawn vehicles in 1850. In 1891 it branched out into railroad car manufacture, the company was renamed "Nesselsdorfer Wagenbau-Fabriksgesellschaft", and it employed Hugo Fischer von Röslerstamm as technical director in 1890. After the death of Schustala, von Röslerstamm took over running the company and in 1897 he bought a Benz automobile. Using this for inspiration, the company made its first car, the Präsident, under the direction of engineers Hans Ledwinka and Edmund Rumpler, which was exhibited in 1897 in Vienna. Orders were obtained for more cars, and until 1900, nine improved cars based on Präsident were made.

This was followed by the Type B with central engine in 1902 but then Ledwinka left the company to concentrate on steam engine development. He returned in 1905 and designed a completely new car, the Type S with 3308 cc 4-cylinder engine. Production was badly hit in 1912 with a 23-week strike and Hugo Fischer von Röslerstamm left the company.

Tatra concept

In 1921 the company was renamed to "Kopřivnická vozovka", and in 1919 the name Tatra was given to the car range. Leopold Pasching took over control and in 1921 Hans Ledwinka returned again to develop the Tatra 11. The new car, launched in 1923, featured a rigid backbone tube with swinging semi-axles at the rear giving independent suspension. The engine, front-mounted, was an air-cooled two-cylinder unit of 1056 cc. In 1924 the company was renamed to "Závody Tatra".

The Tatra 11 was replaced in 1926 by the similar Tatra 12 which had four-wheel brakes. A further development was the 1926 Tatra 17 with a 1,930 cc water-cooled six-cylinder engine and fully independent suspension. In 1927 the company was renamed "Ringhoffer-Tatra".

Streamlined Tatras
Tatra V570 1931, 1933
Tatra 77 1934–1938
Tatra 87 1936–1950
Tatra 97 1936–1939
Tatra 600 Tatraplan 1946–1952
Tatra 603 1956–1975

Prewar streamliners

Tatra's specialty was luxury cars using the most recent technology, going from air-cooled flat-twins to fours and sixes, culminating (briefly) with the OHC 6-litre V12 in 1931. In the 1930s, under the supervision of Austrian engineer Hans Ledwinka, his son Erich and German engineer Erich Übelacker, and protected by high tariffs and absence of foreign assemblers, Tatra began building advanced, streamlined cars after obtaining licences from Paul Jaray, which started in 1934 with the large Tatra 77, the world's first production aerodynamic car. The average drag coefficient of a 1:5 model of the fastback Tatra 77 was recorded as 0.2455. It featured (as did almost all subsequent big Tatras) a rear-mounted, air-cooled V8 engine.

Tatra and the conception of the Volkswagen Beetle
Both Adolf Hitler and Ferdinand Porsche were influenced by the Tatras. Hitler was a keen automotive enthusiast, and had ridden in Tatras during political tours of Czechoslovakia. He had also dined numerous times with Ledwinka. After one of these dinners Hitler remarked to Porsche, "This is the car for my roads". From 1933 onwards, Ledwinka and Porsche met regularly to discuss their designs, and Porsche admitted "Well, sometimes I looked over his shoulder and sometimes he looked over mine" while designing the Volkswagen. There is no doubt that the Beetle bore a striking resemblance to the Tatras, particularly the Tatra V570. The Tatra 97 of 1936 had a rear-located, rear-wheel drive, air-cooled four-cylinder boxer engine accommodating four passengers and providing luggage storage under the front bonnet and behind the rear seat. Another similarity between this Tatra and the Beetle is the central structural tunnel. Tatra launched a lawsuit against Volkswagen for patent infringement, but this was stopped when Germany invaded Czechoslovakia. At the same time, Tatra was forced to stop producing the T97. The matter was re-opened after World War II and in 1965 Volkswagen paid the Ringhoffer family  in an out of court settlement.

Tatra and Volkswagen's body design were preceded by similar designs of Hungarian automotive engineer Bela Barenyi, whose sketches resembling the Volkswagen Beetle date back to 1925.

War years
After the 1938 invasion of Czechoslovakia by Nazi Germany, Tatras were kept in production, largely because Germans liked the cars. Many German officers died in car accidents caused by driving the heavy, rear-engined Tatras faster around corners than they could handle. At the time, as an anecdote, Tatra became known as the 'Czech Secret Weapon' for the scores of officers who died behind the wheel; at one point official orders were issued forbidding German officers from driving Tatras.

Tatra was instrumental in the production of trucks and tank engines for the German war effort.

Postwar management
The factory was nationalised in 1945 almost three years before the Communist Party came to power and in January 1946 was renamed "Tatra Národní Podnik". Although production of prewar models continued, a new model, the Tatra 600 Tatraplan was designed—the name celebrating the new Communist planned economy and the aeroplane inspiration (Colloq. Czech: aeroplán). It went into production in 1948. In 1951, the state planning department decided that the Tatraplan should henceforth be built at the Škoda plant in Mladá Boleslav, leaving Tatra free to concentrate on trucks, buses and railway equipment.

The Tatra 603

In 1953, amid much dissatisfaction among Communist party leaders with the poor-quality official cars imported from Russia, Tatra was again given permission to produce a luxury car, the Tatra 603. Much like Tatra's prewar cars, it was driven by a rear-mounted, air-cooled V8 and had the company's trademark aerodynamic styling. The Tatra 603 initially featured three headlights and the first prototypes had a central rear stabilising fin, though this feature was lost on production vehicles. It was also fitted with almost American-style thick chrome bumpers with bullets (a.k.a. Dagmar bumpers). Almost entirely hand-built, Tatras were not available for normal citizens as they were not permitted to buy them. The cars were reserved for the Communist Party elite and industrial officials, as well as being exported to most other communist nations as official state cars. Notably, Cuban President Fidel Castro had a white Tatra 603, custom-fitted with air conditioning.

Tatra 603s were built until 1975, a twenty-year reign as one of communism's finest cars. Numerous improvements were made during its production run, although not all vehicles built were actually new but rather reconditioned. In exchange for a newer model year car, the older vehicle was returned to the factory. There, it was upgraded to current model year specifications, refinished, and sent out again as a putatively new vehicle to replace another older T603. This makes it difficult to trace the history of surviving vehicles.

1970s makeover—the Tatra 613

In 1968 a replacement was developed: the Tatra 613. It was styled by the Italian styling house of Vignale and was a more modern, less rounded shape. It was not until 1973 that the car went into production, and volume production did not begin until the following year. In addition, it had been moved somewhat forward for improved balance. These cars were built in five series and went through several modifications until production ceased in 1996. Over 11,000 cars were built, and sales slowed to a trickle of just a few dozen per year towards the end of production as Tatras began to seem more and more outdated.

1990s Tatra 700

The Tatra 700 was a large luxury car released in 1996 by Tatra. It was essentially a heavily restyled version of the Tatra 613 model it replaced, with updated body panels and detailing. The T700 was offered as both a saloon and coupé with either a 3.5 or 4.4 litre 90° air-cooled V8 petrol engine.
The model was neither successful nor produced in large numbers, with a total of 69–72 cars manufactured. The T700 was the last passenger car made by Tatra with production halting in 1999. At this point, Tatra abandoned automobile manufacturing in order to concentrate on truck design and manufacture.

1990s Tatra MTX V8

The Tatra MTX V8 was the fastest Czech car of all time. Production started in 1991 in Kopřivnice. It has a Tatra 623 V8 engine with inlet manifold injection producing 225 kW at 6500 rpm. It accelerates from 0– in 5.6 seconds. The Czech designer Václav Král designed this vehicle, with only five ever produced.

2000s
In February 2008, Tatra announced the world's first and only air-cooled engine meeting the then forthcoming Euro 5 emissions standards. The press release claims 7.5 times lower emissions of particulates and 3.5 times lower emission of nitrogen oxides compared to the previous engine. Further, production of air-cooled engines should significantly reduce the production of greenhouse gases due to the absence of liquid cooling systems. All Tatra vehicles from February 2008 onwards should use the new engine.A month later, Tatra CEO Ronald Adams told The Prague Post Tatra could return to producing passenger cars, saying: "We would not come back to compete with the large automobile mass producers such as Volkswagen, Škoda, Toyota etc. But we might come back with a replica of the old Tatra cars using a current undercarriage and driveline from one of the major automotive producers." The company has launched a feasibility study, hoping to produce one thousand replicas of their legendary Tatraplan and 603 cars in 2010.

In July 2008 pictures of a fuel cell concept car designed by Mike Jelinek, the Tatra 903, were shown.

Tatra in the West

Unlike most Eastern Bloc manufacturers, Tatra enjoyed modest sales success in Western Europe, where its truck line had a reputation for simplicity and durability. No effort was made to distribute Tatra's unusual automobiles in the West, though a small number did find their way to collectors in Western Europe, and even to the United States. The end of the Cold War did not help Tatra's fortunes, as the company made no inroads in Western Europe's already crowded automobile market. The introduction of competitors, such as Mercedes-Benz and Peugeot into the Czech Republic, further eroded Tatra's sales. Production of passenger cars ended in 1999.

Among Western collectors, Tatra automobiles remain largely unknown. The largest display of Tatra vehicles in the United States is at the Lane Motor Museum in Nashville, Tennessee. The museum's eclectic automobile collection contains 12 Tatra models, including a T-613 ambulance. When talk show host and car collector Jay Leno visited the museum, the founder picked him up in a 1947 Tatra 87, prompting Leno to purchase one himself. Leno soon became an advocate for the brand. In the United States, the few Tatra clubs are closely associated with Citroën clubs, as many Tatra collectors also collect Citroën DS series cars.

A Tatra 87 is on exhibit at the Minneapolis Institute of Arts.

Trucks

1898–1914 beginning

The first truck manufactured at Kopřivnice in 1898 was a flatbed with two liquid-cooled side-by-side-mounted two-cylinder Benz engines each at 2.7 L capacity with total power output of 8.8 kW (12 hp) placed after the rear axle and cargo capacity of 2.5 ton. The unique feature of the engines setup was that the engines could be operated sequentially depending on the load requirements. No 1 engine was started via a cranking handle and had a flywheel attached and No 2 engine without the flywheel was connected via a gear clutch and started by the first engine already running.

The second truck manufactured was once again a flatbed R type of 2.5 ton cargo capacity built in 1909. Powered by liquid-cooled petrol four-cylinder engine of 4.1 L capacity and power output of 18.4 kW (25 hp) with the engine placed above front axle which is the conventional design to this day. The vehicle featured solid rubber tyres and semi-elliptic leaf spring suspension. In 1910 Tatra manufactured its first bus the Omnibus type SO with total production of five units.

1914–1922 serial production
The first true serial truck production at Tatra was instigated by the beginning of World War I. In the year 1914 there were only two trucks made, type T 14/40 HP; however by 1915's end the production jumped to a total of 105 TL-2 units, and the following year, 1916, the numbers rose to a total of 196 TL-2 and 30 TL-4. Production peaked in 1917 with 19 TL-2 and 303 TL-4 models, but then production declined, and a similar number of vehicles of one type manufactured in a year was not achieved or surpassed until 1936 with the T 27 model.

The TL-2 had a GVM  and  GCM, TL-4 had  GVM and  GCM respectively. Both types remained in production in small series until 1927. The TL-4 is considered the first truck to come out of NW (Nesselsdorfer Wagen-bau) to carry the name Tatra in 1919.

1923–1938 Tatra concept

After the introduction of Tatra 11 and Tatra 12 cars with their distinctive backbone tube design and swing axles, Tatra introduced its first truck on the same basis, the light utility Tatra 13 powered by 2-cylinder air-cooled petrol engine with power output 8.8 kW (12 hp) and  cargo capacity. Further models followed, and in 1926, T23 and T24 were introduced, nicknamed "bulldogs", which could be considered Tatra's precursors to COE designed trucks. Improved version T13 was introduced as T26 with a more powerful 4-cylinder flat air-cooled engine and in six-wheeler chassis created capable offroad light utility truck which later evolved into T72 model which was heavily used by Czechoslovakian army at the time and was also manufactured under license by the French company Lorraine-Dietrich. In 1933 Tatra built a limited series of T25 heavy artillery hauler with 4 and 6-cylinder petrol engines. The most popular Tatra truck before World War II was type T27 powered by 4-cylinder petrol or diesel engines, which remained in production for nearly 17 years (1930–1947) with total production of 7,620 units. By adding an extra axle to the rear the type T28 was created; however, it was not successful and only limited production resulted in a mainly bus chassis. In the period from 1931 to 1938 Tatra also built a small utility truck based on the chassis from T30 named Tatra T43 which remain popular with small business owners. T72 model successfully continued the line to T82 built mainly for military in cargo and personnel transport between 1935 and 1938 and further to T92 and T93 built for the Romanian army from 1938 to 1941 which were identical except T93 had also a driven front axle.

1939–1956 World War II and beyond

Following the Nazi occupation of Czechoslovakia the production at Kopřivnice was annexed by the Germans for the supply of trucks needed by the Wehrmacht. This vehicle evolved in 1942 into the T111 which continued in production until 1962, with the total of 33,690 units made. The T111 also featured Tatra's first air-cooled diesel engine, a massive V12 originally designed for the armoured Sd.Kfz. 234 Puma. In the latter stages of World War II Tatra was instrumental in the development of air-cooled diesel engines for German tanks. In late 1944 General Heinz Guderian ordered that production of the Type 38(t) Hetzer tank be modified to incorporate a Tatra Type 928 V-8 air-cooled diesel engine, though this order was delayed so production could continue uninterrupted. After the war the T111 contributed heavily to the rebuilding effort in Central and Eastern Europe and a memorial was built at Magadan, Siberia, for its exploits in the Far East of the USSR.

1957–1982 moving forward

The decision to replace the reliable but ageing T111 was taken in 1952 based on central planning economy of socialist government where directive was made to Tatra N.P. that it should concentrate on the manufacture of 7 to 10 ton capacity commercial vehicles and in 1956 first T137 and T138 trucks were exhibited at the Czechoslovak machinery expo in Brno. Production of the T111 continued alongside the T138 series until 1962. The T138 itself continued in production until 1969 when it was replaced by the T148, which provided an increase in power output, reliability and product improvements.

In 1967 Tatra began production of the T813 off-road truck using its modular construction technology; the model incorporated the latest trends in commercial vehicle design such as cab-over-engine (COE) and wide profile tyres. It featured a new V12 engine and all military versions had a central tyre inflation/deflation system as standard equipment. The T813 was designed to tow loads up to 100 ton GCM and it was a familiar sight on the roads in Czechoslovakia hauling large, often over-sized loads.

1982–2008 T815 and beyond

The Tatra 815 was designed for extreme off-road conditions, and its road versions are derived from the off-road original. After the 53rd session of the Council for Mutual Economic Assistance, a directive was issued that Tatra N.P. would be the sole supplier of off-road commercial vehicles of <12 ton capacity for Eastern Bloc countries, leading to a modernization of the company and its production models. Following extensive testing at different sites, including Siberia, the type T815 was introduced in 1982 with production starting in 1983. The T815 was made of 142 main assembly components as opposed to the 219 main assembly components of its predecessor. The engine's power output was increased by up to 45% and a new COE tiltable cabin was introduced. Modular engine designs resulted in offerings of V8, V10 or V12 engines with or without turbocharger.

T815 was upgraded to T815-2 with minor cosmetic changes and improved ergonomics and safety – the biggest change was the engine emissions accordance with the "Euro0" limits and to Euro I limits in 1993 (turbocharged V8 engine only since this time for the full legislation; the Deutz 513 air-cooled V8 engine was offered as an alternative). The TerrNo1, introduced in 1997, featured a redesigned cabin as well as better sound and heat insulation than the previous models. The TerrNo1 was based on the same frame as the previous models, so its cabin could be retrofitted to all type T815s built since 1993. In 2000, the TerrNo1 cabin was again redesigned, and for the first time there was an option to fit liquid-cooled engines.

The TerrNo1 model introduced the 'KingFrame rear axle suspension setup. Another step in evolution for the T3B engine came with the Euro II emission limits. Following further improvements in 2003, the T815 had the new Euro III T3C V8 engine mated to all new 14-speed range+split gearbox as well as an option for engines from other suppliers such as Caterpillar, Cummins, Detroit Diesel, Deutz and MTU to be fitted. In September 2006, Tatra introduced its Euro IV compliant turbocharged T3D engine with the SCR exhaust technology and in February 2008 the company introduced the world's first Euro V-compliant air-cooled diesel engine based on the T3D engine.

The T816 (T815-6) Armax and Force series, derivatives of Tatra 815, were introduced in 1993 after Tatra participated in the tender process to supply heavy duty off-road trucks to the UAE armed forces. After two years of bidding, the company secured a contract worth $180 million.

The resulting model became known as T816 "LIWA" (Arabic for "desert"). The latest model intended for military customers is the T817 (T815-7), marketed primarily toward the armed services of NATO member countries as a high-mobility heavy-duty tactical truck with a low profile cabin for C-130 Hercules transportability.

During the 1990s, Tatra decided to produce a bonneted CBE heavy duty off-road truck to continue the successful line started with the T111. This resulted in the T163 Jamal, which was put into full production in 1999 after the first prototypes were built in 1997 and following extensive testing. The T163 was purpose-built to be a heavy duty dump truck due to demand, and was based on Tatra's signature backbone tube chassis construction with its cabin being designed by Jiří Španihel. The truck is used mainly on construction sites and in quarries.

Tatra was also a successful bidder for the Czech Army replacement of aging Praga V3S (with the Tatra I6 air-cooled engine – one half of the T111 V12 one) medium off-road truck with T810 which technically is not a "genuine" Tatra as its origin goes back to when former Czech company ROSS, in partnership with Renault Trucks, obtained a contract to supply the army with medium size off-road trucks, the "ROSS R210 6×6". The company however went bankrupt in 1998 and Tatra bought full rights to the design, then modernized and reintroduced it as T810 while continuing cooperation with Renault. Under the deal Renault supplies the cabins and the engines and Praga supplied axles and transmissions for the prototypes; however, the whole project has been dogged by controversy due to the way Tatra had obtained the contract, its relationship with supplier Praga and the subsequent court case brought against it by Praga.

The serial T810 vehicles are equipped with the new design Tatra rigid axles with the WABCO disc brakes, with the ZF Ecolite transmission and Steyr drop box.

Navistar and Tatra
Tatra and Navistar Defence introduced at Eurosatory Exposition in Paris, France (Jun 14–18 2010), the results of their strategic alliance since October 2009, the models ATX6 (universal container carrier) and ATX8 (troop carrier). The vehicles appear to be based on Tatra 815-7 (T817) 6×6, 8×8 chassis, suspension and cabins while using Navistar engines and other components. Under the deal Navistar Defence and Tatra A.S. will market the vehicles in North America, which includes sales to the United States military and foreign military sales financed by the United States government. Tatra will source parts and components through Navistar's global parts and support network for Tatra trucks delivered in markets outside of North America as well as market Navistar-Tatra vehicles around the world in their primary markets.

Ownership
The Terex Corporation, an American company, acquired the majority ownership (71%) of Tatra in late 2003. As of late 2006, however, majority ownership (80.51%) was in the hands of Tatra Holdings s.r.o., an international consortium comprising Vectra Limited of UK, Sam Eyde of the U.S., KBC Private Equity of Belgium, Meadowhill s.r.o. of Czech Republic and Ronald Adams of the U.S. On 15 December 2006, a contract was signed between Tatra and the Czech Republic for 556 trucks at roughly $130 million, or 2.6 billion Czech crowns. This contract was signed in lieu of replacement of older military vehicles.

In April 2007, Tatra announced that it had already matched its production in 2006 and produced 1,600 vehicles. In 2007, Tatra planned to produce between 2,300 and 2,500 vehicles. In contrast to previous years, Tatra has increased employment by the hundreds within the past two quarters, has reversed previous errors, and was growing again.

In August 2011, DAF Trucks announced it had built up a 19% stake in Tatra to tighten up cooperation between the companies. DAF's cabs and Paccar engines became mainstay of the civilian Tatra 158 Phoenix, while DAF dealerships started selling Tatra trucks.

In early 2013, Tatra was facing mounting financial problems. Even though the company had sufficient orders for new trucks, manufacturing was halted as banks refused to provide further loans and company was facing imminent bankruptcy. In March 2013, majority stake in Tatra was acquired by major Czech defense contractor Czechoslovak Group and Czech metalurgy company Promet Group, which provided company with necessary financial stability. With new owners, Tatra focused its production primarily towards building specialist vehicles tailored to buyers' custom orders. While in 2013 sales amounted to 722 units, in 2023 the company plans to sell over 2.000 trucks, with future increases in sales requiring enlarging of manufacturing capacity.

Current models 
Tatra does not rely just on serial production, but also supplies individual, highly specialized custom-made vehicles. The company also sells its own chassis. The current serial production models are:

 Tatra 810 Tactic – medium off-road truck based on conventional frame, portal axles and equipped with Renault water-cooled engine and cabin. Primarily intended for military operators, also offered on civilian market.
 Tatra 817 Force – heavy off-road truck based on Tatra backbone chassis, Tatra air-cooled engines (other engines also possible) and Tatra cabin. Primarily intended for military operators, also offered on civilian market.
 Tatra 158 Phoenix – heavy off-road truck based on Tatra backbone chassis and equipped with DAF cabin and ZF water-cooled engines. Primarily intended for civilian operators, also offered on military market.

Worldwide distribution

Germany 
Several fire brigades and civil protection (THW) mostly in eastern Germany are traditionally using Tatra trucks. Tatra's own conversion company THT build vehicles for fire brigades and civil protection. Popular in Germany is a large Water tender and pumper based on the Tatra 815. The vehicle's water tank has a volume of 4,000 liters or more and a separate tank for foam agent. The 4×4 transmission and a gear wading depth of 1.20m make it suitable for rough terrain. In German use the vehicle is called "TLF4000" (Tanklöschfahrzeug 4000) and is primarily used at airports and to fight forest fires. 

In 2021 the Bundeswehr fire brigade ordered 76 Tatra firefighting vehicles to fight forest fires (ordered by BwFuhrparkService GmbH). They are based upon the Tatra T 815-7 4×4 chassis, with equipment by Austrian Rosenbauer Group.

India 
Tatra had a truck-building joint venture in India called Tatra Vectra Motors Ltd, formerly called Tatra Trucks India Ltd. It is a joint venture between Tatra and the Vectra Group from England. In 2002, the company received a 1,070 trucks order from the Government of India. Tatra's growing involvement in India's defense industry has been cited as an example of growing relations between Czech Republic and India.

In 2009, Vectra announced a new joint venture with Russia's Kamaz to form Kamaz Vectra Motors Limited to manufacture Kamaz trucks in India. This joint venture replaced the former Tatra Vectra venture. The manufacturing plant is located in Hosur, Tamil Nadu. The fully integrated manufacturing facility includes an engine assembly and testing plant, a cabin welding shop, a frame fabrication shop and a test track. Most Tatra trucks for sale in India are manufactured in collaboration with Bharat Earth Movers Limited (BEML).

Tatra was part of a 2012 investigation in what has been described a "procurement scam" involving former BEML chief VRS Natarajan.

Israel 

Reportedly following one of the Israeli-Arab conflicts, Israel tested some Tatras captured from the Egyptian armed forces. The Israel Defense Forces' command was apparently quite impressed with their performance, independent air cooling, and their capabilities as military trucks in long-range raiding operations in desert terrain, and became interested in including these trucks in their arsenal. As direct purchase from Czechoslovakia was impossible due to its alignment with Israeli foes, the lore has it that Israelis used the well-paid services of Nicolae Ceauşescu-led Romania, in cooperation with an American Company called ATC (American Truck Company) to purchase military trucks, including desert-equipped Tatras, leading to jokes that "Romania has a new desert". Current photos of various Israeli weapon systems, including SPYDER slated for India, show new Tatras as the carrier vehicles.

A number of Tatra trucks entered service in the Israeli Army's various sectors, with the brand mark of "American Truck Company", under which Tatras were sold from the U.S. market and exported to Israel.

United States 
American Truck Company was a quasi-independent company set up by Terex, when they controlled Tatra, to import Tatra vehicles in both knock down kits or fully built and carry out assembly operations, repair and service, body building on chassis in the United States. These trucks were offered to the military and other government organizations and were badged and sold in the United States under the ATC brand. ATC badged Tatras were fitted with American Cummins turbodiesel engines in place of the Tatra's air-cooled diesel.

Tatra aircraft

The Ringhoffer-Tatra Works Ltd. produced several aircraft and aero-engines in the 1930s and 1940s before annexation by Germany, and after under the orders of the RLM. Among the aircraft produced were the following:-

Built under licence
 Tatra T.126 (Avro 626 Avian)
 Tatra T.131 (Bücker Bü 131 Jungmann)

Tatra designed and built
 Tatra T.001
 Tatra T.002
 Tatra T.003
 Tatra T.101
 Tatra T.201
 Tatra T.301
 Tatra T.401

Historic models

Passenger cars

Before the company was renamed to Tatra
 NW Präsident
 NW A
 NW B
 NW C
 NW D
 NW E
 NW Elektromobil
 NW F
 NW J
 NW L
 NW S
 NW T
 NW U

After the name Tatra was adopted
 Tatra 10
 Tatra 11
 Tatra 12
 Tatra 17
 Tatra 20
 Tatra 26
 Tatra 30
 Tatra 52
 Tatra 54
 Tatra 57: Tatra 57 A and Tatra 57 B
 Tatra 70
 Tatra 75
 Tatra 77
 Tatra 77A
 Tatra 80
 Tatra 87
 Tatra 97
 Tatra 600 Tatraplan
 Tatra 603
 Tatra 613
 Tatra 623
 Tatra 700

Trucks

 NW First Truck
 NW TL-2
 NW TL-4
 Tatra 13
 Tatra 22
 Tatra 23
 Tatra 24
 Tatra 25
 Tatra 26
 Tatra 27
 Tatra 28
 Tatra 29
 Tatra 43
 Tatra 49
 Tatra 52
 Tatra 72
 Tatra 74
 Tatra 79
 Tatra 81
 Tatra 82
 Tatra 85
 Tatra 92
 Tatra 93
 Tatra 111
 Tatra 114
 Tatra 115
 Tatra 128
 Tatra 138
 OT-64 SKOT Tatra engine powered 8×8 armored personnel carrier
 Tatra 141
 Tatra 147
 Tatra 148
 Tatra 158 Phoenix
 Tatra 163 Jamal
 Tatra 700
 Tatra 805
 Tatra 810 ANTS
 Tatra 813
 RM-70 8×8 armored multiple rocket launcher based on Tatra T813
 Tatra 815, 815-2 and TerrNo1
 Tatrapan 6×6 Armored vehicle based on the Tatra 815 chassis.
 Tatra 816
 Armax Trucks 4×4, 6×6 and 8×8 with air-cooled Tatra engines and transmissions by Tatra
 Tatra 817

Buses
 Tatra 24
 Tatra 27
 Tatra 43
 Tatra 72
 Tatra 114
 Tatra 500

Trolleybuses

 Tatra T86 (1936–38)
 Tatra T400 (1949–55)
 Tatra T401 (1958; only one built)

Prototypes and racing cars
 NW Rennzweier (1900)
 Tatra 12 Targa Florio (1925)
 Tatra 30 Sport (1926)
 Tatra 84 (1935)
 Tatra 90 (1935)
 Tatra 107 (1946)
 Tatra 116/117/120 (1948)
 Tatra 118/119/122 (1948)
 Tatra 130 (1951)
 Tatra 131 (1951)
 Tatra 137 (1956)
 Tatra 157 (1972)
 Tatra 201 (1947)
 Tatra 600 Diesel (1952)
 Tatra 601 Convertible (1951)
 Tatra 601 Monte Carlo (1949)
 Tatra 602 Tatraplan Sports
 Tatra 603 A (1964)
 Tatra 603 B5 (1966)
 Tatra 603 B6 (1967)
 Tatra 603 MB (1961)
 Tatra 603 Monte Carlo
 Tatra 603 X (1966)
 Tatra 604 (1954)
 Tatra 605 (1957)
 Tatra 607 (1950)
 Tatra 607-2 (1953)
 Tatra 625 (1986)
 Tatra 803 (1950)
 Tatra 804 (1951)
 Tatra 806 (1951)
 Tatra 809 (1953)
 Tatra Baghira (1973)
 Tatra Delfín (1963)
 Tatra JK 2500 (1956)
 MTX Tatra V8 (1991)
 Tatra Prezident (1994)
 Tatra V570 (1931)
 Tatra V855 (1942)
 Tatra 163 Jamal Evo (2003)

See also
 František Kardaus
 Austro-Tatra
 Avia
 List of Czech automobiles
 List of automobile manufacturers

Notes

References

Sources
 Tatra company profile, Retrieved 2008-11-29
 Present Tatra military trucks (T810, T815, T816, T817)
 Tatra history at Tatra World
 Grey, C.G. & Bridgman, Leonard. Jane's All the World's Aircraft 1938. Sampson Low, Marston & company, ltd.. London. 1938
 Willson, Quentin The Ultimate Classic Car Book. New Your, New York: DK Publishing Inc., 1995. . Pages 214-215

Further reading
 
 
 Tatra Automobiles - Luxury Cars from Koprivnice 1920–1940 by Miroslav Gomola, AGM publisher Czech republic
 List of Literature and Magazines articles related to Tatra

External links

 Tatra Official site
 TATRA GERMANY
 Tatra India
 Tatra and Tatraplan cars site
 Tatra Cars Services
 International Streamlined Tatra Site
 Tatra Aircraft History 
 Tatra Museum
 "Tatra’s Long Twilight Is Explored at a Tennessee Museum" at NY Times, July 20, 2011
 the unofficial Tatra Automobile pages - history and pictures (English)
 the unofficial Tatra Truck History pages - history and pictures (English)

 
Czech brands
Rear-engined vehicles
Luxury motor vehicle manufacturers
Motor vehicle manufacturers of Czechoslovakia
Aircraft manufacturers of the Czech Republic and Czechoslovakia
Aircraft engine manufacturers of the Czech Republic
Truck manufacturers of the Czech Republic
Trolleybus manufacturers
Vehicle manufacturing companies established in 1850
Vehicle manufacturing companies established in 1897
Defence companies of the Czech Republic
Bus manufacturers of the Czech Republic
Diesel engine manufacturers